Thomas Henry Davey (1856 – 5 April 1934) was a New Zealand Member of Parliament for the electorates of City of Christchurch and Christchurch East. He is regarded as a member of the Liberal Party, but was critical of aspects of the party and its leadership.

Early life
Davey was born in Liskeard in south east Cornwall, England. He learned the trade of printing.

With his parents, he came to New Zealand in 1874, arriving in Wellington on the Douglass. They lived in Feilding (where he worked as a saw miller), Wellington (where he worked for the Government printer) and then Christchurch. He was a printer for the Lyttelton Times newspaper and became President of the Typographical Union and Vice-President of the Trades and Labour Council.

On 8 August 1884, he married Maude Davey, daughter of John Dobson (surveyor) from Oxford.

Member of Parliament

From between the general elections of 1902 and 1905, Davey was one of the three members of parliament representing the multi-member City of Christchurch electorate. He had been presented with a petition to stand for parliament and came third out of nine contenders in this three-member electorate, behind Tommy Taylor and Harry Ell.

In 1905, these multi-member electorates were split up, and he won the Christchurch East electorate against three other contenders: William Whitehouse Collins (who had previously been in Parliament for the Liberal Party), Henry Toogood (a young engineer who only recently left Canterbury College and who would become one of the founding members of the Institution of Professional Engineers New Zealand), and Frederick Cooke (a prominent member of the Socialist Party).

Davey held Christchurch East to 1914, when he retired.

Like Harry Ell, Davey showed an independent attitude towards the Liberal Government. He demanded an elective executive, and said that Premier Richard Seddon held too many portfolios. He also believed that the Cabinet should be reconstructed. Nonetheless, Davey is listed as a member of the Liberal Party in Wilson's New Zealand Parliamentary Record : 1840–1984.

Davey was elected Mayor of St Albans in 1897. He was a member of the Hospital Board and the Board of Canterbury College.

The Lyttelton Times parliamentary correspondent described Davey as: "tall, straight, solidly built – the best Mayor St. Albans ever had".

Death
Davey died on 5 April 1934 and was buried at Linwood Cemetery.

References

Further reading

|-

1856 births
1934 deaths
Independent MPs of New Zealand
New Zealand Liberal Party MPs
New Zealand trade unionists
English emigrants to New Zealand
People from Liskeard
Mayors of places in Canterbury, New Zealand
New Zealand MPs for Christchurch electorates
Burials at Linwood Cemetery, Christchurch
Members of the New Zealand House of Representatives